is a Japanese football player for Verspah Oita.

Career
Hirohito Shinohara joined J2 League club Renofa Yamaguchi FC in 2016. In 2017, he moved to J3 League club Fujieda MYFC.

Club statistics
Updated to 23 February 2018.

References

External links

1993 births
Living people
Kansai University alumni
Association football people from Ibaraki Prefecture
Japanese footballers
J2 League players
J3 League players
Japan Football League players
Renofa Yamaguchi FC players
Fujieda MYFC players
Verspah Oita players
Association football midfielders